"Dream Again" is a song by Filipina singer Lea Salonga. It was released as a single on August 21, 2020. The song was written by Daniel Edmonds and Blair Bodine.

The single was released to raise funds for charities aiding in relief from the COVID-19 pandemic around the world, including The Actors Fund. The single later inspired the title for Salonga's 2022 tour by the same name.

Composition and lyrics 
"Dream Again" runs for a total duration of three minutes and sixteen seconds (3:16). Lyrically, the song discusses the ups and downs of each day and overcoming the troubles of lockdowns during the COVID-19 pandemic. Salonga's vocals for the song range from G3 to E5, with E5 in both head voice and chest mix.

Critical reception 
The single received positive reviews and critics and fans alike. It was called an "inspiring anthem" by Ali Stagnitta of Hollywood Life and Andrew Gans, Ryan McPhee, and Dan Meyer of Playbill. The song was also described as "an uplifting song about fulfilling one's dreams" by ABS-CBN.

Music video 
The music video for "Dream Again" premiered on Salonga's official YouTube channel alongside the release of the single. It begins with a photograph of Salonga holding a sign that reads "Send me your dreams using #LSdreamagain." The video then visualizes Salonga singing in her home in Manila alongside background vocalists Mat Verevis and Elandrah Feo, pianist Daniel Edmonds, guitarist Paul Viapiano, and drummer Joe Accaria. Throughout the video, images of various people are shown holding signs with their written responses. The responses included hopes of seeing their loved ones, traveling, returning to school, and performing on stage. The video was produced by Marathon Digital. The video has been viewed more than 50,000 times.

Performances 
Almost one year after the song's release, Salonga first performed the song at the second edition NF Hope Concert livestream event on May 2, 2021. Salonga performed the song virtually for a second time at Time's Uplifting AAPI Voices Summit on May 27, 2021. This solo version included less emphasis on instruments and background vocals.

The first live performance was on April 6, 2022 in Winnipeg, Manitoba during the Dream Again Tour. The arrangement began with a slower tempo than the original release before picking up with the entrance of drums and bass guitar. Some performances of the song included a live orchestral accompaniment. Salonga included the song in the setlist for the entire 32-show international tour.

Credits and personnel 
Credits adapted from the official music video on YouTube.

 Lea Salonga – vocals
 Daniel Edmonds – composing, lyrics, production, piano
 Blair Bodine – lyrics
 Paul Viapiano – guitar
 Joe Accaria – drums
 Ben Cohn – production
 Mat Verevis – background vocals
 Elandrah Feo – background vocals
 Christopher Hewitt – production, mixing

See also 
 Lea Salonga discography

References

External links 

 Music video on YouTube

2020 songs
2020 singles
Lea Salonga songs
Pop songs
English-language Filipino songs
Songs about the COVID-19 pandemic
2020 in Philippine music